The 2022 Men's U21 Volleyball South American Championship was the 25th edition of the Men's Junior South American Volleyball Championship, organised by South America's governing volleyball body, the CSV. The tournament was held in Tacna, Peru from 14 to 18 September 2022. The top two teams of the tournament qualified for the 2023 FIVB Volleyball Men's U21 World Championship as the CSV representatives.

Players must be born on or after 1 January 2003.

Competing nations
Hosts

Qualified teams

Format
Teams will play against each other in a full Round-robin tournament. The top 2 teams qualified to 2023 FIVB Volleyball Men's U21 World Championship.

Pool standing procedure
 Number of matches won
 Match points
 Sets ratio
 Points ratio
 If the tie continues as per the point ratio between two teams, the priority will be given to the team which won the match between them. When the tie in points ratio is between three or more teams, a new classification of these teams in the terms of points 1, 2, 3 and 4 will be made taking into consideration only the matches in which they were opposed to each other.

Match won 3–0 or 3–1: 3 match points for the winner, 0 match points for the loser
Match won 3–2: 2 match points for the winner, 1 match point for the loser

Round Robin
All times are Peru Time (UTC−05:00).

|}

Day 1

Day 2

Day 3

Day 4

Day 5

Awards

Most Valuable Player
 Arthur Bento
Best Setter
 Gustavo Cardoso
Best Outside Spikers
 Arthur Bento Leonel Despaigne

Best Middle Blockers
 Maicon Dos Santos Imanol Salazar
Best Opposite Spiker
 Germán Gómez
Best Libero
Filipe Baioco

References

Note
 was scheduled to participate in this tournament but withdraw later.

2022 in volleyball
2022 in men's volleyball
2022 in Peruvian sport
Men's South American Volleyball Championships
South American Volleyball Championship